Hired Guns is a role-playing video game developed by DMA Design (published by Psygnosis) for the Amiga and the PC in 1993. The game is set in the year 2712, in which the player controls four mercenaries selected from a pool of twelve. One of the features of the game is that all four characters are on screen simultaneously, each in their own window.

Plot
A team of outlaw mercenaries, led by the character Rorian are hired to destroy all of the illegally bio-engineered organisms on the planet Graveyard via means of a fusion induced thermonuclear explosion. Which is to be achieved by collecting four fusion power core rings, and depositing them in the corresponding field coil generator located at Graveyard Central Spaceport. The secondary mission objective is to reconnoitre ground installations.

Gameplay
The game uses a system of four simultaneous Dungeon Master-style first-person perspective viewpoints in the world. Each character is individually controllable and occupies their own square, unlike Dungeon Master, in which the entire party occupies the same square. Each character can be made to follow another character, simplifying large group movements when only one player is controlling the party.
The gameplay was advanced for its time, allowing up to four players to play simultaneously, using mouse, keyboard or (modified) Sega Mega Drive joypad, with a parallel port adaptor allowing four joypads/joysticks to be used at once.

The game area is in real 3D, and monster/enemy AI have free movement around each level environment. This is unlike other games of its time, in which enemies cannot pursue characters up stairs. An array of light and heavy weapons (including robot sentries, similar to those seen in Aliens Special Edition), incendiary devices, mines and grenades can be used to take out the enemy (or friends!) either on the same level as the player or below.

Players have to manage their inventory, too, as the combined weight of the items in a character's inventory is limited by his/her/its carrying capacity. If this limit is exceeded the message "Too heavy!" will be displayed on the character's viewpoint and he/she/it may not add anything more to the inventory until enough items have been discarded or consumed to bring the total weight below his/her/its carrying capacity again. There are no other penalties on movement or actions for carrying too heavy a load.

Different characters have different carrying capacities. E.g. a heavy combat droid can lug around more weight than a human female.

Also included are devices called "Psionic Amps" that can be used to create strange effects on the player or on the world around them — e.g. one type of Psionic Amp can be used underwater to create an area of air so human characters can breathe.

Underwater areas affect gameplay in two major ways: Human characters will drown if they stay under for too long while weapons and equipment will take damage at varying rates until they are destroyed outright. Energy weapons are particularly susceptible to water damage and most types will be destroyed in mere seconds unless protected by a suitable psionic amp which must be activated before entering the water. Neither robotic nor human characters can swim, but are relegated to walking around on the bottom in the same manner as on land.

Release
British magazine Amiga Power (AP) had a long running gag about Hired Guns. It printed a thin strip on the back cover with a few lines about next month's issue and a screenshot of an upcoming game. As the Hired Guns release was delayed, Amiga Power repeatedly used the same screenshot, with repeated reassurances that they might, possibly, have it by next month. When the game finally arrived, it remained in the Next Month strip along with text suggesting it was stuck there and nobody knew how to remove it.

Reception
Computer Gaming World in 1994 praised Hired Gunss multiplayer mode when playing the campaign or minigames, noting the "fantastic moments of surprise" from friendly fire or nearby allies unintentionally preventing a wounded player from escaping. The magazine criticized the "thorough, but flawed" documentation and "extremely intrusive copy protection", inability for keyboard players to strafe, and clumsy inventory management, but concluded that "Hired Guns is viscerally satisfying". In 1996, GamesMaster ranked Hired Guns 62nd on their "Top 100 Games of All Time."

References

External links

Hired Guns at Hall of Light

1993 video games
Amiga games
Cyberpunk video games
DMA Design games
DOS games
Dungeon crawler video games
First-person shooters
Multiplayer and single-player video games
Role-playing video games
Science fiction video games
Psygnosis games
Video games developed in the United Kingdom